Little Marie is a 1915 American short drama film directed by Tod Browning.

Cast
 Walter Long
 Seena Owen as Bianca Pastorelli (as Signe Auen)
 Charles West as Beppo Puccini (as Charles H. West)
 Tom Wilson as Sam Coggini

References

External links

1915 films
American silent short films
American black-and-white films
Films directed by Tod Browning
1915 drama films
1915 short films
Silent American drama films
1910s American films